Renata Borgatti  (March 2, 1894 – March 8, 1964) was an Italian classical musician, performing in Europe and the United States.

Early life
She was the daughter of the great Wagnerian tenor Giuseppe Borgatti (1871–1950), whose imposing career at Milan's  La Scala opera house was ended by blindness.  Trained initially as a ballerina, she abandoned dance to become a concert pianist, specialising in the works of Claude Debussy.

Relationships
A lesbian, she settled on the Mediterranean island of Capri in the early 1900s, where her lifestyle raised fewer eyebrows than elsewhere in Europe. In 1918, she entered into a lesbian affair with an Italian socialite (and baroness) Mimì Franchetti. The two remained together for just over a year, until Franchetti left Capri and linked with the prominent American artist Romaine Brooks.

Borgatti had an affair with Faith Compton Mackenzie, whose husband Compton Mackenzie wrote of the island's lesbian residents in the 1928 satirical roman à clef Extraordinary Women, about a group of lesbians arriving on the island of Sirene, a fictional version of Capri.

In 1920, Borgatti left Capri to pursue her career on the European mainland. She also began a romantic liaison with Brooks, who was by that time pursuing a relationship with the American writer Natalie Barney. Borgatti's affair with Brooks proceeded on and off for at least three years, but was curtailed when Brooks began avoiding her. During the early-1920s, she became intimately involved with Winnaretta Singer, heiress to the Singer sewing machine fortune.

Career
She performed on stage with the violinist Olga Rudge during this period. They worked frequently together, despite the presence of Rudge's lover, the famous poet Ezra Pound, who was then working as a music critic. Pound was not impressed by Borgatti's playing, describing it as "plonking". Like many musicians of the day, she disliked Pound, due mostly to the inconsistency in his assessments. Irrespective of Pound's disregard for Borgatti's musical talents, and her disregard for him, she and Rudge continued to play together for several years: it is likely that they simply shared the same musical tastes.

Borgatti later taught music, dying in Rome of leukemia in 1964.

References

External links
Renata Borgatti, images.

1894 births
1964 deaths
Italian classical pianists
Italian women pianists
Italian lesbian musicians
20th-century classical pianists
Deaths from leukemia
Deaths from cancer in Lazio
20th-century Italian women musicians
20th-century women pianists